Huishui Miao, a.k.a. Huishui Hmong, is a Miao language of China. It is named after Huishui County, Guizhou, though not all varieties are spoken there. The endonym is Mhong, though it shares this with Gejia and it is simply a variant spelling of Hmong. Raojia is closely related.

Huishui was given as a subgroup of Western Hmongic in Strecker (1987). Matisoff (2001) split it into four separate languages, and, conservatively, did not retain it as a group.

References

West Hmongic languages
Languages of China